Anıl Berkan Kılıçsallayan is a Turkish freestyle wrestler competing in the 125 kg division. He is a member of Kahramanmaraş BBSK.

Career 

In 2021, he won the gold medal in the men's 125 kg event at the 2021 European U23 Wrestling Championship held in Skopje, North Macedonia.

References

External links 
 

Living people
Turkish male sport wrestlers
Year of birth missing (living people)
21st-century Turkish people